Micro-Partitioning is a form of logical partitioning which was introduced by IBM on systems using the POWER5 processor, and is also referred to as a shared processor partition, and only differs from a dedicated processor partition in the way CPU utilization is configured and managed by the POWER Hypervisor (PHYP) firmware. All IBM POWER5 and POWER6 systems are partitioned and will run "on top" of the PHYP.

The POWER Hypervisor controls time slicing, management of all hardware interrupts, dynamic movement of resources across multiple operating systems, and dispatching of logical partition workloads. 

When a shared processor partition is activated by the PHYP, the LPAR is guaranteed a certain processing capacity, if needed, and a number of virtual processors, based on configuration and current availability. The processing capacity is drawn from a pool of shared processor resources.

The minimum processing capacity per processor is 1/10 of a physical processor core, with a further granularity of 1/100, and the PHYP uses a 10 ms time slicing dispatch window for scheduling all shared processor partitions' virtual processor queues to the PHYP physical processor core queues. A shared processor partition can be either capped or uncapped. A capped partition can never exceed the currently configured processing capacity, whereas an uncapped partition can exceed the currently configured processing capacity up to 100% of the number of the currently configured virtual processors.

If the shared processor partition is DLPAR capable, the number of virtual processors and processing capacity can be altered dynamically for the partition.

See also
VM (operating system)
PowerVM
LPAR

External links
IBM System p Virtualization — The most complete virtualization offering for UNIX and Linux
System i and System p: Introduction to Virtualization
System i and System p: Advanced POWER Virtualization Operations Guide
System i and System p: Logical Partitioning Guide
Advanced POWER Virtualization on IBM System p5: Introduction and Configuration
IBM System p Advanced POWER Virtualization Best Practices
Partitioning Implementations for IBM eServer p5 Servers, SG24-7039
POWER5 Hypervisor
Virtualization Concepts
Virtualization in System p
POWER5 Hypervisor

Hardware partitioning
IBM computer hardware